Alexandra Nicole Cardona Rodríguez (born 12 January 1989), known as Alexa Cardona, is an American-born Puerto Rican retired footballer who has played as a forward. She has been a member of the Puerto Rico women's national team. She is the sister of Julián Cardona.

Early and personal life
Cardona was raised in Lincoln, Nebraska.

International goals
Scores and results list Puerto Rico's goal tally first.

References

1989 births
Living people
Women's association football forwards
Puerto Rican women's footballers
Puerto Rico women's international footballers
Competitors at the 2010 Central American and Caribbean Games
American women's soccer players
Soccer players from Atlanta
Soccer players from Nebraska
Sportspeople from Lincoln, Nebraska
American sportspeople of Puerto Rican descent
Nebraska Cornhuskers women's soccer players
21st-century American women